Otto Gerstenberg (11 September 1848 – 24 April 1935) was a German entrepreneur, mathematician and an early 20th-century Berlin art collector.

Life 
In his childhood Gerstenberg lived in Pyritz. Gerstenberg studied mathematics and philosophy in Berlin. Since 1873 Gerstenberg worked as mathematician for assurance  Allgemeinen Eisenbahn-Versicherungs-Gesellschaft, which later became German assurance Victoria. In 1888, Gerstenberg became member of supervisory board in that assurance and was since 1891 CEO of the assurance.

In 1884, Gerstenberg married Elise Wilhelmine Winzerling, with her he had two daughters. The family home was first at Großbeerenstraße in Berlin-Kreuzberg and later in Berlin-Lichterfelde. His daughter Margarete married physicist Hans Georg Scharf.

Gerstenberg collected art. During World War II, part of his collection was destroyed and other works were seized from Nazi Germany, ending up in Russian museums. His collected paintings went to his daughter, Margarete Scharf, who stored most in the bunker of the Nationalgalerie in Berlin during the war. These were taken to the Soviet Union. Others were put in storage and burned in an air raid. The surviving artworks remained in family ownership and were inherited by his grandson, Dieter Scharf.

Gerstenberg is buried at the St. Annen cemetery in Dahlem, Berlin.

Collected arts by Gerstenberg

See also 
 Scharf-Gerstenberg Collection

References

External links 

 

20th-century German businesspeople
German art collectors
20th-century art collectors
1848 births
1935 deaths
19th-century German businesspeople
Businesspeople from Berlin
20th-century German mathematicians
Art crime
19th-century German mathematicians
People from Pyrzyce